Jan Hendrik de Boer (19 March 1899 – 25 April 1971) was a Dutch physicist and chemist.

De Boer was born in Ruinen, De Wolden, and died in The Hague. He studied at the University of Groningen and was later employed in industry.

Together with Anton Eduard van Arkel, de Boer developed a chemical transport reaction for titanium, zirconium, and hafnium known as the crystal bar process. In a closed vessel the metal reacts with iodine at elevated temperature forming the iodide. At a tungsten filament of 1700 °C the reverse reaction occurs, and the iodine and the metal are set free. The metal forms a solid coating at the tungsten filament and the iodine can react with additional metal, resulting in a steady turnover.

M + 2I2 (>400 °C) → MI4 
MI4 (1700 °C) →   M + 2I2

De Boer became a member of the Royal Netherlands Academy of Arts and Sciences in 1940, and foreign member in 1947.

See also
Metal–insulator transition
Van Arkel–de Boer process

References

1899 births
1971 deaths
People from De Wolden
20th-century Dutch chemists
Academic staff of the Delft University of Technology
Members of the Royal Netherlands Academy of Arts and Sciences